Club Ninja is the 10th studio album by American hard rock band Blue Öyster Cult, released on Dec. 10, 1985 in the United Kingdom and on Feb. 11, 1986 in the United States. The album was intended as a comeback for the band, whose previous album The Revölution by Night failed to attain Gold status following the success of 1981's Fire of Unknown Origin and 1982's Extraterrestrial Live. Club Ninja sold more than 175,000 copies, falling well short of gold status again, and because of its high cost, Columbia Records executives deemed it a commercial failure. The album was re-issued on compact disc on March 10, 2009, by Sony-owned reissue label American Beat Records, which had also reissued the band's 1988 album, Imaginos.

Club Ninjas first single, "Dancin' in the Ruins," was a minor radio and MTV hit. "When the War Comes" features a brief spoken-word introduction by radio personality Howard Stern, whose cousin was married to guitarist and vocalist Eric Bloom. The lyrics to "Spy in the House of the Night" were written by Richard Meltzer, originally based on his poem "Out of Smokes," which was published in his 1999 book Holes. The album was the band's last studio album with bassist Joe Bouchard.

Club Ninja was the only BÖC studio album not to feature keyboardist Allen Lanier until his death in 2013. Lanier was replaced temporarily by Tommy Zvoncheck, who'd previously been keyboardist for Aldo Nova's live band, for a Japanese tour by Public Image Ltd. and had already contributed to the initial recordings of Blue Öyster Cult's 1988 concept album Imaginos. The album also features drummer Jimmy Wilcox, formerly of Rick Derringer and Scandal, who replaced Rick Downey. Wilcox remained with the band until 1987.

Reception

Edwin Pouncey, reviewing the album for Sounds, gave it a five-star rating, describing it as "a seemingly leaden slab of AOR which suddenly turns into gold in your hands", praising Sandy Pearlman's production. Modern reviews are quite negative, with AllMusic calling Club Ninja a testimony of "Blue Öyster Cult's gradual disintegration" and "decline into musical anonymity". Canadian journalist Martin Popoff judged the album the "least attached to the BÖC body of work, painfully constructed and baffling in its bad taste", showing a band struggling to update their sound to more "commercial avenues" without achieving the expected radio-friendly results.

Track listing

Personnel
Band members
Eric Bloom – lead vocals, stun guitar
Donald "Buck Dharma" Roeser – vocals, lead guitar, keyboards
Joe Bouchard – bass, guitar, vocals
Tommy Zvoncheck – keyboards, background vocals
Jimmy Wilcox – percussion, background vocals

Additional musicians
Thommy Price – drums
Phil Grande – guitars
Kenny Aaronson – bass
David Lucas, Joni Peltz, Dave Immer, Joe Caro – background vocals
Howard Stern – opening to "When the War Comes"

Production
Sandy Pearlman – producer, management
Paul Mandl – engineer, overdubs editor, programming
John Devlin, Toby Scott – engineers
David Lucas – additional production
Brian McGee – mixing

Charts

Album

Singles
"Dancin' in the Ruins"

References

Blue Öyster Cult albums
1985 albums
Columbia Records albums
Albums produced by Sandy Pearlman